Cardioglossa leucomystax is a species of frog in the family Arthroleptidae. It is found in large parts of Central Africa (Cameroon, southeastern Central African Republic, Equatorial Guinea, Gabon, the Republic of the Congo, and northeastern Democratic Republic of the Congo), extending into south-easternmost West Africa (Nigeria). The type locality is Cap Saint Jean in Equatorial Guinea. Populations from the Upper Guinean Forests of West Africa between Ghana and Sierra Leone previously allocated to this species were in 2008 described as a new species, Cardioglossa occidentalis. Common name silver long-fingered frog has been coined for Cardioglossa leucomystax.

Description
Adult males measure  and adult females  in snout–vent length. The tympanum is easily visible. Cardioglossa leucomystax resembles Cardioglossa occidentalis but most obviously differs from it by the white infratympanal line that extends to the nostril (terminating below the eye in C. occidentalis). The flanks are usually spotted, but in some populations the spots are almost absent, forming a nearly continuous line with the dark face mask. In juveniles, the spots may be entirely absent.

Habitat and conservation
Cardioglossa leucomystax, defined as including Cardioglossa occidentalis, occur in lowland and lower montane forests, including secondary forests and heavily degraded habitats. They are usually found near stream margins with small stones and sand. Males call from among rocks in dense vegetation near the streams. Breeding takes place in streams during the dry season.

This species is very common in parts of its range, notably in Gabon. It is probably affected by habitat loss. It occurs in some protected areas, such as the Virunga National Park in the Democratic Republic of Congo and Korup National Park in Cameroon.

References

leucomystax
Frogs of Africa
Amphibians of Cameroon
Amphibians of the Central African Republic
Amphibians of the Democratic Republic of the Congo
Amphibians of Equatorial Guinea
Amphibians of Gabon
Fauna of Nigeria
Taxa named by George Albert Boulenger
Amphibians described in 1903
Taxonomy articles created by Polbot